Too Many Crooks is a lost 1927 American silent comedy film directed by Fred C. Newmeyer, written by E.J. Rath and Rex Taylor, and starring Mildred Davis, Lloyd Hughes, George Bancroft, El Brendel, William V. Mong, John St. Polis and Otto Matieson. It was released on April 2, 1927, by Paramount Pictures.

Cast  
Mildred Davis as Ceia Mason
Lloyd Hughes as John Barton
George Bancroft as Bert the Boxman
El Brendel	as Botts
William V. Mong as Coxey, the Con-man
John St. Polis as Erastus Mason
Otto Matieson as Fast Hands Foster 
Betty Francisco as Frisco Flora
Gayne Whitman as Marshall Stone
Tom Ricketts as Butler
Cleve Moore as Freddie Smythe
Ruth Cherrington as Mrs. Smythe
Pat Hartigan as 'Big Dan' Boyd

References

External links 
 

1927 films
1920s English-language films
Silent American comedy films
1927 comedy films
Paramount Pictures films
Films directed by Fred C. Newmeyer
American black-and-white films
Lost American films
American silent feature films
1927 lost films
Lost comedy films
1920s American films